KSOU may refer to:

 Karnataka State Open University
 KSOU (AM), a radio station (1090 AM) licensed to Sioux Center, Iowa, United States
 KSOU-FM, a radio station (93.9 FM) licensed to Sioux Center, Iowa, United States